Fagagna is a comune (municipality) in the Province of Udine in the Italian region Friuli-Venezia Giulia, located about  northwest of Trieste and about  northwest of Udine.

The municipality of Fagagna contains the frazioni (subdivisions, mainly villages and hamlets) Ciconicco, Villalta, San Giovanni in Colle, Battaglia, and Madrisio.

Fagagna borders the following municipalities: Basiliano, Colloredo di Monte Albano, Martignacco, Mereto di Tomba, Moruzzo, Rive d'Arcano, San Vito di Fagagna.

It is well known among nature-lovers for being the municipality which holds the nature reserve which bred the critically endangered Northern Bald Ibis or Waldrapp, from which 37 of the many individuals present were released in 2014 (under somewhat mysterious circumstances).

The local festival held every September includes two traditional events which attract a lot of tourists: a donkey race - Corsa degli Asini  - since 1891, and "Palio dei Borghi, theatre performances given by the inhabitants of the four "borghi", the districts of the town, on the main square.

Demographic evolution

References

External links
 www.comune.fagagna.ud.it/

Cities and towns in Friuli-Venezia Giulia